Kösbucağı is a village in Erdemli district of Mersin Province . At  it is a dispersed mountain village situated in forests. The population of the village was 1885. as of 2012. There are Roman and Byzantine ruins (including a bridge) around the village. But the inhabitants are of Turkmen origin. Main economic activity is farming. Citrus, various fruits and vegetables are produced. There is also a poultry farm in the village. Some village residents work in chromium mines next to the village.

References

Villages in Erdemli District